Sardar Asad Ullah Jan Khan (also, Asadullah Khan and Asadjan Khan) was a Pakistani Pakhtun politician from Kulachi, who represented North-West Frontier Province in the Constituent Assembly of Pakistan. Chieftain of the Gandapur tribal segment, Khan commanded influence in the society; besides, he was a local land magnate.

Political Career

British India 
In the 1937 North-West Frontier Provincial Assembly Elections, Khan filed his nomination from Kulachi, a rural constituency reserved for Muslims, as an independent. He was pitted against Ramzan Khan from the Indian National Congress who accused him to be a kafir and even obtained a proclamation from Kifayatullah Dehlawi about the religio-moral responsibility of Muslims to vote for him. About half of the electorate skipped the polls, and Asadullah Khan scraped through barely. 

In the Assembly, Khan joined the United Muslim Nationalist Party, a patchwork party formed by Abdul Qayyum Khan to form a coalition government in a hung House; the party remained in power for about six months, doing little of significance, before falling to Congress and disintegrating. Under the Congress Ministry, the Muslim League gained significant base in the province; its ascent was particularly aided by the British Government's outlawing of the Congress as a response to the Quit India Movement. In 1943, after a prolonged period of Governor's Rule, the League formed the government; Asadullah Khan chose to side with the Congress initially but went on to join the League. However, the Muslim League had to bear the brunt of intense factional rivalries, winning over, and also losing, heavyweights at regular intervals. Asadullah Khan parted ways with the League in 1944, taking umbrage at the party's choice of candidate in the bye-elections from a warring tribal faction. Soon, the Government fell to Congress. 

In the 1946 elections, the Congress formed a stable government under the premiership of Abdul Ghaffar Khan. Khan was re-elected but as a member of the Jamiat-ul-Ulema-e-Hind, allied to the Congress. He defeated Sardar Abdul Qaiyum Khan of the Muslim League. In July 1947, a referendum was held in the province with the options of joining either India or Pakistan. The Congress government called for a boycott citing the absence of provisions to remain independent or join Afghanistan; Khan adhered to the party line. However, while half of the legible voters did skip the referendum, over 99% of the votes cast were in favor of Pakistan.

Pakistan

Provincial Assembly 
In August 1947, Jinnah requested Ghaffar Khan and his fellow legislators from Congress to concede that they did not have the confidence of the electorate and resign but was refused; within a week, Jinnah had Governor Cunningham dismiss the government and install Abdul Qayyum Khan as the caretaker Chief Minister. Qayyum Khan convinced a few Congress legislators — by force or favor — to switch to the League but failing to secure a majority even by the end of the year, did not convene the House. In January 1948, Asadullah Khan along with six other Congress legislators met Liaquat Ali Khan at Lahore and joined the League, providing Qayyum Khan's government with the numbers; the House would sit for the first time after independence in March 1948. 

In March 1949, Khan joined a group of fellow legislators from the League to pass a no-confidence motion against the government. However, a day before the resolution was to be tabled, most of them were imprisoned on grounds of consipiring to murder Qayyum Khan. Lacking the strength to effect a succeful motion, Khan alongside five others, noted their discontent with Qayyum Khan's governance and requested the Speaker that they be not considered to be part of the government anymore; eventually, they became the new Opposition in the House replacing a group of three MLAs from the defunct Congress. Within a week, Khan and others were expelled from the League for a period of six years for "grave and flagrant breach" of party decorum.

Constituent Assembly 
In March 1948, Khan was inducted as a replacement for Abul Kalam Azad — the erstwhile representative of the province in the Constituent Assembly of India on a Congress ticket — in the Constituent Assembly of Pakistan. One of the liberal members of the Assembly, Khan was among the three members from West Pakistan to support Nur Ahmed's proposal of incorporating Bengali as an official language of the state alongside Urdu in the aftermath of the February 1952 events during the Bengali language movement. He was a strong critic of Pakistan's expenditure on defense and lamented the neglect of agricultural sector.

Notes

References 

Members of the Provincial Assembly of Khyber Pakhtunkhwa
Members of the Constituent Assembly of India
Members of the Constituent Assembly of Pakistan
People from Dera Ismail Khan District